The Namiestnik (or Viceroy) of the Kingdom of Poland was the deputy of the Emperor of Russia who, under Congress Poland (1815–1874), styled himself "King of Poland". Between 1874 and 1914, when the former Congress Poland was known as the Vistula Country, the title Namiestnik was replaced by that of Governor-General of Warsaw.

History
The office of Namiestnik was introduced in Poland by the Constitution of Congress Poland (1815), in its Article 3 (On the Namiestnik and Council of State). The namiestnik was chosen by the Tsar from among the noble citizens of the Russian Empire or the Kingdom of Poland, excluding naturalized citizens. The namiestnik supervised the entire public administration and, in the monarch's absence, chaired the Council of State of Congress Poland, as well as the Administrative Council of Congress Poland. He could veto the councils' decisions; other than that, his decisions had to be countersigned by the appropriate government minister. The namiestnik exercised broad powers and could nominate candidates for most senior government posts (ministers, senators, judges of the High Tribunal, councilors of state, referendaries, as well as bishops and archbishops).

The namiestnik had no competence in the realms of finances and foreign policy; his military competence varied. In the event that the namiestnik were unable to exercise his office due to resignation or death, this function would be temporarily carried out by the president of the Council of State.

The office of namiestnik was never officially abolished; however, the last namiestnik was Friedrich Wilhelm Rembert von Berg, who served from 1863 to his death in 1874. No namiestnik was named to replace him; however, the role of namiestnik—viceroy of the former Congress Kingdom, now called the Vistula Country—passed to the Governor-General of Warsaw—or, to be more specific, of the Warsaw Military District. However, in the internal correspondence of Russian Imperial offices this functionary was still called namiestnik.

The governor-general answered directly to the Tsar and exercised much broader powers than had the namiestnik. In particular, he controlled all the military forces in the region and oversaw the judicial systems (he could impose death sentences without trial). He could also issue "declarations with the force of law," which could alter existing laws.

Viceroys of the Kingdom of Poland 
 Józef Zajączek (1815–26)
 Vacant, 1826–31 (power and responsibilities were exercised by the Administrative Council)
 Ivan Paskevich (1831–55)
 Mikhail Dmitrievich Gorchakov (1855 – 3 May 1861)
 Nikolai Sukhozanet (16 May 1861 – 1 August 1861)
 Karl Lambert (1861)
 Nikolai Sukhozanet (11–22 October 1861)
 Alexander von Lüders (November 1861 – June 1862)
 Grand Duke Konstantin Nikolayevich of Russia (June 1862 – 31 October 1863)
 Friedrich Wilhelm Rembert von Berg (1863–74)

Governors-General of Warsaw
 Count Paul Demetrius von Kotzebue (1874–80)
 Pyotr Pavlovich Albedinsky (1880–83)
 Joseph Vladimirovich Gourko (1883–94)
 Pavel Andreyevich Shuvalov (1894–1896)
 Alexander Imeretinsky (1896–1900)
 Mikhail Chertkov (1900–05)
  (1905)
 Georgi Skalon (1905–14)
 Yakov Zhilinskiy (1914)
 Pavel Yengalychev (1914–1915)

See also
Guberniya
Ambassadors and envoys from Russia to Poland (1763–1794)
Governor-General of Finland
Governor-General of Lithuania/Governor-General of Vilnius/Governor-General of Wilno
Namiestnik's Palace (today, Presidential Palace, Warsaw)

Notes
a  The office is referred to in sources by various names. Namiestnik is sometimes translated as "viceroy," "regent" or "lord lieutenant," and even "Prince" of Poland or Prince of Warsaw.  The Governor-General of Warsaw is sometimes referred to as "Governor-General of the Kingdom of Poland" or "Governor-General of Poland."  Some sources erroneously apply the term namiestnik to the period after 1874, or "governor-general" to the earlier period.

b  Sources are contradictory as to whether the namiestnik had competence in the military realm. Certainly from 1815 to 1831 the Congress Kingdom's military was controlled by Grand Duke Constantine Pavlovich of Russia, who de facto had more power than the namiestnik, Józef Zajączek. Zajączek died in 1826 and was not replaced until 1831, when the November 1831 Uprising saw Ivan Paskevich assume the post of namiestnik—as well as command of  Russian military forces in the region, as he was tasked with defeating the Uprising. The question of who controlled the military after Paskevich's death is unclear, but again the last namiestnik, Fyodor Berg, was tasked with crushing another Polish uprising—the January 1863 Uprising—and commanded the military.

References
Inline

General

Government of Congress Poland
Heads of state of Poland
Political history of Poland
!
Government of the Russian Empire